Illinois elected its sole at-large member August 5, 1822.

See also 
 1822 and 1823 United States House of Representatives elections
 List of United States representatives from Illinois

1822
Illinois
United States House of Representatives